Mojtame-ye Meskuni Neka Chub (also Romanized as Mojtame`-ye Meskūnī Nekā Chūb) is a village in Kuhdasht-e Sharqi Rural District, in the Central District of Miandorud County, Mazandaran Province, Iran. At the 2006 census, its population was 57, in 15 families.

References 

Populated places in Miandorud County